Walter Kenneth Martinez, Sr. (November 16, 1930 – May 11, 1986) was an American attorney and politician who served as a member of the New Mexico House of Representatives. A liberal member of the Democratic Party, he served as speaker of the House for eight years. before being removed from the position in 1979, when conservative Democrats allied with Republicans to elect a conservative Democrat as speaker.

Early life and education

Martinez was born in Tierra Amarilla, New Mexico, one of eleven children in poor but well-educated family. He studied law at the University of New Mexico and graduated in 1955. He became a general legal practitioner with the firm of Tibo Chavez and Boucher and established an office in Grants, New Mexico.

Career

In 1966, Martinez was elected to the New Mexico House of Representatives as a Democrat representing Valencia County, New Mexico. He served in the House for eighteen years. Until 1971, the House had been dominated by conservative Democrats, mostly from the south and east of New Mexico. That had begun to change after the Supreme Court "one man, one vote" decision in Baker v. Carr (1962), which forced electoral districts to be more balanced in size and led to growing numbers of liberal Hispanic and urban intellectual representatives. In 1971, when Martinez was in his third term, the position of speaker came open. After a tie on the first vote, Martinez was elected speaker by a one-vote margin.

For eight years Martinez was one of the leaders of the liberal "Mama Lucy Gang", which controlled the house and prevented conservative "Cowboy Democrats" from the ranching areas in the south of the state from controlling the main committees. Another leader was Raymond G. Sanchez. Martinez's achievements included equalizing school district funding across the state and developing New Mexico's severance tax permanent fund.

In 1977 Martinez was chosen as candidate for speaker of the Democratic caucus by 26–22, going on to reelection as speaker. The Cowboys did well in the 1978 election and demanded a strong presence in the committees. Martinez refused, which turned out to be a mistake.
He was then chosen the Democratic caucus by 30 votes to 11 for Gene Samberson. During the opening session of the house on January 16, 1979, eleven Democrats allied with twenty six Republicans to elect the Cowboy Democrat Gene Samberson as speaker by thirty seven votes against the thirty Democrats and three rogue Republicans who voted for Martinez. The Mama Lucy Gang remained out of power for the next four years.

Martinez and Joseph Fidel worked together to obtain funding for many projects in the Grants area. In 1981 Martinez was the main force behind the legislation that split Cibola County, New Mexico, out of Valencia County. Grants was the seat of the new county. In the 1982 election, the liberal Democrats formed a solid majority of the forty seven Democrat members, and the Martinez-backed candidate Raymond G. Sanchez was elected speaker without opposition from the Cowboys.

Personal life

Martinez was married to Dolores Nolasco. They had three children, a girl and two boys, all of whom became lawyers. His eldest son, W. Ken Martinez, served as a member of the New Mexico House of Representatives from 1998 to 2016. His daughter became a district judge. His youngest son served on the Grants Board of Education.

Martinez was diagnosed with Amyotrophic lateral sclerosis (Lou Gehrig's disease) and left the House in 1984. He died in 1986 at the age of 55. An enclosed walkway linking the Capitol and the newly built Capitol Annex was dedicated to Martinez in 2001.The University of New Mexico School of Law posthumously awarded his the Distinguished Achievement award.

References

Sources

1930 births
1986 deaths
People from Grants, New Mexico
People from Rio Arriba County, New Mexico
University of New Mexico alumni
New Mexico lawyers
Members of the New Mexico House of Representatives
Speakers of the New Mexico House of Representatives
Deaths from motor neuron disease
Neurological disease deaths in New Mexico
20th-century American politicians
20th-century American lawyers